Vakilabad (also Romanized as Vakīlābād) is a village in Sardabeh Rural District, in the Central District of Ardabil County, Ardabil Province, Iran. At the 2006 census, its population was 888, in 180 families.

References 

Towns and villages in Ardabil County